Holbert is a surname. Notable people with the surname include:

Aaron Holbert (born 1973), American baseball player
Al Holbert (1946–1988), American racing driver
Bruce Holbert (born 1959), American writer
Chris Holbert, American politician
Darius Holbert (born 1974), American musician
Jerry Holbert, American cartoonist
Henry Holbert (1927–1995), American football coach
Ray Holbert (born 1970), American baseball player
William Dathan Holbert (born 1979), American murderer